is a beach volleyball game by Tecmo released in 2003 exclusively for the Xbox. The game was a departure from the rest of the Dead or Alive series which otherwise consisted of fighting games. It also marked the first game in the series to have a Mature rating from the Entertainment Software Rating Board.

The game is set immediately after the tournament in Dead or Alive 3 ended. Gameplay revolves around the women of the DOA series playing various mini-games in the many locations of Zack Island, a reclusive private resort on an island owned by Zack, the only male character from the series to appear anywhere in the game. This installment features no fighting engine, instead being much like a simulation game that encourages the player to establish relationships with the AI of characters, and eventually make a two-person team to compete in volleyball competitions. Currency earned from completing mini-games and gambling in the island's casino allows the player to purchase hundreds of different swimsuits to wear in the game.

Its sequel, Dead or Alive Xtreme 2, was released on November 13, 2006, exclusively for the Xbox 360. The next sequel, Dead or Alive Xtreme 3, was released on March 24, 2016 in Asian countries.

Gameplay 
In the main story mode, players select a woman to play as for the duration of their two-week period. Since the volleyball matches in the game are always two on two, the player automatically begins with a partner. Each day, players can select one activity in the morning, one in the afternoon, and one in the evening. While players do have an opportunity to simply relax during these time periods, they are generally used to either court new partners, or to challenge existing partnerships to a game of volleyball. Winning a match provides money which can be used to buy swimsuits and accessories, either for oneself, or as gifts to bestow upon the other women. Alternatively, players can also earn money through gambling at a casino located on the island.

Playing volleyball is done primarily through the use of two buttons, one designated for spiking and blocking, and the other for receiving or setting. As many of the actions happen automatically (e.g., jumping up to spike the ball), the game forces the player to focus on timing; a poorly timed press of a button results in a weak hit or a smash into the net. While it is possible to manually direct one's partner towards or away from the net, she will generally move to cover whichever area the player has left empty. The game is one of the few to make use of the analog sensitivity of the face buttons on the Xbox controller, with a softer touch allowing one to barely hit the ball over the net.

In addition to the core volleyball mechanic, the game features a relationship system between the various women on the island. Through gifts and skillful play, players can induce other characters to increase their esteem and positive feelings toward the character being played. A positive relationship with one's partner can translate into better performance during a volleyball match, while strong relationships with the other women leads to opportunities for new partners. Conversely, negative feelings from a partner can lead to missteps on the court, or can lead to gifts being thrown away unopened.

All money carries over between vacations, so that unspent "Zack bucks" can be used by a different character selected on the next play-through. Similarly, all swimsuits acquired by a given character remain with that character for all future play sessions. Since each character has access to a different set of swimsuits at the shop, the majority of suits for each character can only be acquired as gifts. Many of the costumes are very revealing and make the women appear almost nude in some instances. This, coupled with the suggestive poses the women present themselves in (which can be viewed and zoomed in on from almost any angle, as controlled by the player) led to the first Mature rating in the series' history.

While the game is entirely played with Japanese voiceovers, the story cutscenes are played with English and Japanese voiceovers.

Characters 
There are eight playable characters, seven from previous Dead or Alive titles plus Lisa, who makes her debut in this title. Zack (voiced by Dennis Rodman) is not a playable character but appears in the game's beginning and ending cinematics, with small appearances throughout the game. His girlfriend, Niki (voiced by Kari Wahlgren), appears only in cutscenes. As such, the volleyball players consist of:

 Ayane – Japanese ninja and rival (as well as half-sister) of Kasumi. (voiced by Wakana Yamazaki)
 Christie – British assassin and automobile enthusiast. (voiced by Kotono Mitsuishi)
 Helena – French opera singer fond of walking her dog. (voiced by Yuka Koyama)
 Hitomi – German/Japanese high-school student and aspiring chef. (voiced by Yui Horie)
 Kasumi – Japanese runaway ninja who enjoys fortune-telling and origami. (voiced by Houko Kuwashima)
 Leifang – Chinese college student with an interest in aromatherapy. (voiced by Yumi Tōma)
 Lisa – American stock broker and amateur surfer. (voiced by Maaya Sakamoto)
 Tina – American wrestler and daughter of Bass Armstrong. (voiced by Yūko Nagashima)

Each of the playable characters has her own likes and dislikes (documented in the game manual), which influence how likely she is to accept or be impressed by certain gifts. Favorable gifts include those based on her favorite food, favorite color, and hobbies. In order to suit the lighter, more playful nature of the game, the Dead or Alive characters' previous rivalries were reduced to just a general dislike in this title. As a result, even characters who would normally try to kill another (such as Ayane and Kasumi, or Christie and Helena) can become fast friends through a brief exchange of gifts.

Plot
Zack gambles his winnings from the Dead or Alive 3 tournament at a casino. In the process, he hits the jackpot, earning a ridiculously large sum of money. The money is used to purchase a private island, which he promptly turns into a resort named after himself ("Zack Island"). He then invites the women from the previous tournament (along with one newcomer — his girlfriend, Niki) to his island under the pretense that the next Dead or Alive tournament will be held there. The women arrive and after discovering the truth, (namely that it was merely a hoax) decide to make the best of the situation by spending two weeks vacationing on the island.

At the end of the two-week time period, the ladies depart, leaving only Zack and Niki on the island. Shortly thereafter, a volcano, previously thought to be inactive, spontaneously erupts, threatening to destroy Zack's island. In the chaos, Niki escapes using Zack's jetpack. Zack survives the volcanic eruption, but the island itself is completely destroyed. While not part of the game itself, Zack's later Dead or Alive 4 ending shows the pair robbing an ancient tomb and escaping with a truck filled with gold, suggesting a possible financing source for a sequel. In the sequel, it is confirmed that this is indeed the source for financing "New Zack Island".

Development
During Dead or Alive 2's development, the fan base requested Team Ninja to add a beach volleyball mini game as other fighting games had similar mini games. After Dead or Alive 3's release, the staff later decided to create the beach volleyball game as a standalone game.

Soundtrack

Reception 

Reviewers were mostly positive, especially to the depth of the volleyball game, as well as with the high quality of the visuals and animation. Review scores ranged from poor to very high, resulting in the averaged ratings of 74% at GameRankings and 73/100 at Metacritic.

In its review, Edge focused on the game's unusual social, rather than adversarial, focus. Maxim gave the game a score of eight out of ten and stated that "The sharp graphics and advanced jiggle physics will no doubt prick the interest of lonely gamers, but surprisingly, the game's volleyball action is pretty solid. And that's the most important thing... right?" Entertainment Weekly gave it a B and said, "It's kinda difficult not to get caught up in this goofy title, as you use your v-ball winnings to buy shoes and skimpy clothes for your fellow beach bunnies." Playboy gave it a score of 74% and said, "As long as you know what you're in for, DOA: Xtreme Beach Volleyball can be a mildly entertaining collection of digital diversions with, at the very least, the best-looking virtual women to grace a video game."

At the first Spike Video Game Awards in 2003, Dead or Alive Xtreme Beach Volleyball won in the category Best Animation. In 2006, GamesRadar ranked gravure scenes in the game to be one of the 100 greatest gaming moment in history. Conversely, Dead or Alive Xtreme Beach Volleyball won the "GameSpot's Best and Worst of 2003" in "Dubious Honors" category for Most Embarrassing Game.

In Japan, the game sold over 122,000 copies during its release week including 73,000 copies on its launch day. By the end of the year it had sold over 127,000 units in the region according to Media Create sales data.

Lawsuit
In January 2005, Tecmo sued Ninjahacker.net, a hobbyist game modding site dedicated to user-created modifications to the game and other Tecmo games. The site included custom skins that made the game's characters fully nude. Tecmo alleged that the site breached the Digital Millennium Copyright Act and other laws, and sought between $1,000 and $100,000 for every skin swapped on the site. Tecmo said the lawsuit was necessary to "uphold the integrity of our work", while a lawyer for the non-profit Electronic Frontier Foundation said the suit was "absurd" and that the site's offerings were "completely legal". Ultimately, the site was shut down and the defendants reached an undisclosed settlement with Tecmo.

References

External links
Official website

2003 video games
Beach volleyball video games
Dead or Alive (franchise) spin-off games
Koei Tecmo franchises
Multiplayer and single-player video games
Obscenity controversies in video games
Photography games
Video games developed in Japan
Video games featuring female protagonists
Video games with custom soundtrack support
Works about vacationing
Xbox games
Xbox-only games
Bishōjo games
Spike Video Game Award winners